Marcelo Ríos defeated Andre Agassi in the final, 7–5, 6–3, 6–4 to win the men's singles tennis title at the 1998 Miami Open. With the win, he completed the Sunshine Double.

Thomas Muster was the reigning champion, but did not participate this year.

Seeds 
All thirty-two seeds received a bye to the second round.

Draw

Finals

Top half

Section 1

Section 2

Section 3

Section 4

Bottom half

Section 5

Section 6

Section 7

Section 8

External links 
 Main draw

Men's Singles